Diospyros borneensis is a tree in the family Ebenaceae. Twigs are reddish brown when young, drying black. Inflorescences bear up to 20 flowers. The tree is named for Borneo. Habitat is forests from sea-level to  altitude. D. borneensis is found in Peninsular Thailand, Sumatra, Peninsular Malaysia and Borneo.

References

borneensis
Plants described in 1873
Trees of Thailand
Trees of Sumatra
Trees of Peninsular Malaysia
Trees of Borneo